Thomas Ingram (dates unknown) was an English cricketer of the late 18th century.  He was a left-handed batsman and a wicketkeeper.

According to Scores and Biographies, Ingram was for a time a victualler at Cobham in Surrey.  His career began with Surrey but from the 1791 season he played for Essex, having apparently joined the famous Hornchurch Cricket Club.

Ingram's best performance as a keeper was in the Kent v Essex match at Dartford Brent in August 1792 when he took five catches and made three stumpings for Essex, which was to no avail as Kent won by 81 runs.

Thomas Ingram made 24 known appearances in major matches between 1787 and 1798.

References
 Fresh Light on 18th Century Cricket by G B Buckley (FL18)
 The Dawn of Cricket by H T Waghorn (WDC)
 Scores & Biographies, Volume 1 by Arthur Haygarth (SBnnn)

Year of birth missing
Year of death missing
English cricketers
Essex cricketers
Surrey cricketers
English cricketers of 1787 to 1825
Marylebone Cricket Club cricketers
Left-Handed v Right-Handed cricketers
Non-international England cricketers
Hornchurch Cricket Club cricketers
London Cricket Club cricketers